The John M. and Elizabeth Bates House No. 1 is a historic house in Portland, Oregon, United States. Architect Wade Pipes, a pivotal figure in the Arts and Crafts movement in Oregon, designed the house in the mid-1930s for his close friends John and Elizabeth Bates. Built in 1935, it represents that decade's transition in Pipes' focus from English vernacular exterior elements toward clean lines, rectilinear forms, and minimal decoration. Its interior spaces and details express his devotion to Arts and Crafts principles. John and Elizabeth Bates subsequently commissioned three further houses from him.

The house was added to the National Register of Historic Places in 1990.

See also
National Register of Historic Places listings in Southwest Portland, Oregon
John M. and Elizabeth Bates House No. 4

References

External links

1935 establishments in Oregon
Houses completed in 1935
Houses on the National Register of Historic Places in Portland, Oregon
Arts and Crafts architecture in Oregon
Southwest Hills, Portland, Oregon
Portland Historic Landmarks